Bugis MRT station is an underground Mass Rapid Transit (MRT) interchange station on the East West line and Downtown line in Bugis, Singapore. Located under the junction of Rochor Road and Victoria Street, the station is close to Bugis Junction, Raffles Hospital and the National Library. Built as part of the initial MRT system, the station opened in November 1989 as part of the MRT network's eastern line, while the station's Downtown line platforms were opened in December 2013.

History

East West line
The MRT Corporation also monitored old buildings close to the station site for movement during construction, and a section of Victoria Street between Rochor Road and Cheng Yan Road was realigned for six months in 1986 to allow the construction of diaphragm walls at the station site.
In response to a suggestion by the Singapore Tourist Promotion Board, the station was renamed Bugis in November 1986 after Bugis Street, a tourist spot near the station. The station was opened on 18 November 1989, as part of the MRT system's eastern line from Marina Bay to Tanah Merah.

Facilities for the disabled and elderly were added to the station by June 2006, and in December 2011, a QR code shopping wall was launched at the station by SMRT.

Downtown line
In April 2007, the Land Transport Authority announced that Bugis station would be part of the first stage of the Downtown line (DTL), and the contract for the construction and completion of Bugis station and its associated tunnels was awarded to Soletanche Bachy – Koh Brothers Joint Venture for approximately S$582 million in November 2008. Rochor Road was realigned to facilitate the station's construction, while to make way for the station, the DHL Balloon ceased operations in October 2008, and the New 7th Storey Hotel closed by the end of that year, with the hotel site taken over by the government.

During the station's construction, the soil at the station site, consisting of soft marine clay, was strengthened using cross walls, while to mitigate noise pollution, an acoustic screen was installed beside a residential area, and a special enclosure was constructed around the excavation site.  Most of the station was built using the cut-and-cover method, with a bottom-up method used for the section between North Bridge Road and Beach Road, while between North Bridge Road and Queen Street, as the road above could not be easily diverted, a top down method was used, with excavation of the station commencing only after the walls and roof of the station were built.

Mining was used to construct tunnels at Beach Road, Queen Street, and under the existing East West line station. For the tunnels at Beach Road and Queen Street, the soil around the tunnels was stabilised using jet grouting, a retaining structure comprising horizontal pipe piles was installed using compressed air operated hammers, and steel frames were used to support the piles during the tunnels' construction. On the other hand, for the tunnel under the existing station, fibreglass soil nails were used to strengthen the soil, while clearance issues in certain portions of the tunnel necessitated the manual installation of steel frames during excavation.

In July 2012, the collapse of scaffolding holding up the roof of a linkway at the station site resulted in the death of two workers, and injured another eight. The DTL station opened on 22 December 2013, along with the rest of the first stage of the line.

Station details
Located beneath the junction of Victoria Street and Rochor Road, the station is close to Fu Lu Shou Complex, Raffles Hospital, the National Library and Bugis Junction. The station is served by the East West line, between Lavender and City Hall, and the Downtown line, between Rochor and Promenade, and has the station codes "EW12" for the East West line and "DT14" for the Downtown line on official maps.

Built to function as an air-raid shelter during emergencies, the EWL station was fitted with steel blast doors that could seal off the station concourse and platforms, while the DTL station is located  under the surface, and features the extensive use of diamond-shaped patterns, which The Straits Times views as related to the diamond motif in Bugis culture.

Public art
The DTL station features Ephmeral by Patrick Chia. Comprising frosted glass panels with coloured discs that can only be seen at certain angles, the artist told The Straits Times that the artwork was meant to create "a concept that exploits the constraints and opportunities afforded by the architecture space" and that it was "not meant to be obvious but to engage each commuter at his or her own moment".

References

External links

 SBS Transit's Bugis MRT station official website
 
 Bugis to Changi Airport MRT station route guide

Railway stations in Singapore opened in 1989
Downtown Core (Singapore)
Mass Rapid Transit (Singapore) stations